The  Edmee S.  is a Chesapeake Bay log canoe. She was built in the Tilghman Island style from hewn logs by Oliver Duke in the 1930s.  She is one of the last 22 Chesapeake Bay racing log canoes, and is actively raced with a crew of nine to eleven people.  Her original name was Cecilia Mae, but was renamed for Edmee S. Combs, whose husband funded the restoration.  The hull was covered with fiberglass during the restoration. She is owned by the Chesapeake Bay Maritime Museum in Saint Michaels, Maryland and currently skippered by Marshall Patterson.

References

External links
, including photo dated 1984, at Maryland Historical Trust

Individual sailing vessels
Chesapeake Bay boats
Museum ships in Maryland
Ships on the National Register of Historic Places in Maryland
National Register of Historic Places in Talbot County, Maryland
Chesapeake Bay Maritime Museum